Drift Racing Team is the Formula ISIE Team of NIT Jamshedpur. It is a Student-led initiative in the Institute to design, manufacture and race a Formula style F3 Electric car in various Formula ISIE events across the globe. It was founded in 2009 by Automobile enthusiasts, earlier one of the first SAE teams of the Institute. Its current goal is to participate in the event of ISIE 6th Formula Imperial HVC- Electric Vehicle Category in the year 2020 to be held at Buddh International Circuit, Greater Noida.

Achievements
 Formula Student India, 2018
 Overall 35th rank among a total of 112 teams from all across India.
 Formula Student India 2016
 9th in cost and manufacturing event.
 Applauded for Real Case Scenario.
 Participated in all three static events.
 Formula Design Challenge, 2015
 2nd lightest car and 6th in Business Presentation.
 Formula Student United Kingdom 2011
 5th in Airbus Teamwork Award among 133 teams from all over the world.
 Formula SAE Australasia 2010
 1st in Cost Event and Presentation.
 Formula SAE India Design Challenge 2009
 2nd Runner up Overall.

Racing seasons

Season 2019-2020

Season 2015-2016

Season 2014-2015

Season 2010-2011

References

External links 
 Institute link
 Telegraph India story, published February 02, 2010
 Dainik Jagaran story, published July 09, 2011

National Institute of Technology, Jamshedpur